Isophytol is a terpenoid alcohol that is used as a fragrance and as an intermediate in the production of vitamin E and K1.

Occurrence
Isophytol has been in found in two red algae species and more than 15 plant species. Concentrations found have been low.

Synthesis
It can be synthesized in six steps from pseudoionone and propargyl alcohol. Total synthesis begins with the combination of acetylene and acetone to produce 3-methyl-1-butyn-3-ol. Hydrogenation by palladium catalysis results in 3-methyl-1-buten-3-ol. Reaction with diketene or acetic acid ester creates the acetoacetate; thermal reaction leads to 2-methyl-2-hepten-6-one. The steps of adding acetylene and then isopropenyl methyl ether and hydrogenating the product are done twice (this involves an intermediate of pseudoionone); then acetylene is added to create dehydroisophytol. Hydrogenation results in isophytol.

Uses
Production industrially was estimated to be 35000 to 40000 tons in 2002, created by total synthesis, with about 99.9% used in synthesizing vitamin E and vitamin K1. More than 95% of the less than 40 tons used annually in consumer products is as a fragrance. Less than 2 tons a year is used for flavoring.

In perfumes the concentration is 0.2% v/v at most.

Toxicology
Oral  values in mammals are greater than 5000 mg/kg.

See also
 Phytol
 Phytantriol

References

Bibliography

Tertiary alcohols
Diterpenes
Fatty alcohols
Alkenols